Untersulmetingen is a village which is part of the municipality of Laupheim, in the state of Baden-Württemberg, Germany.

Geography 
Besides the village itself, the hamlets Westerflach and Niederkirch belong to its administration. Most of Untersulmetingen is located to the west of the river Riss which flows into the river Danube about 9 kilometres to the north of the village. Untersulmetingen Castle is situated in the village.

History 
The first documentary evidence of Sulmetingen dates from 853. Sulmetingen was divided into Untersulmetingen and its neighbour village Obersulmetingen in 1441.

References

External links 
Official web page on the website of Laupheim (in German)

Laupheim
Villages in Baden-Württemberg